Prosipho may also refer to the precursor to a siphuncle in cephalopods.

Prosipho is a genus of sea snails, marine gastropod mollusks in the family Buccinidae, the true whelks.

Species
Species within the genus Prosipho include:

 Prosipho amiantus Oliver & Picken, 1984
 Prosipho antarctidis (Pelseneer, 1903)
 Prosipho astrolabiensis (Strebel, 1908)
 Prosipho aurora Hedley, 1916
 Prosipho bisculpta Thiele, 1912
 Prosipho cancellatus Smith, 1915
 Prosipho certus Thiele, 1912
 Prosipho chordatus (Strebel, 1908)
 Prosipho congenitus Smith, 1915
 Prosipho contrarius Thiele, 1912
 Prosipho crassicostatus (Melvill & Standen, 1907)
 Prosipho daphnelloides Powell, 1958
 Prosipho elongatus Thiele, 1912
 Prosipho enricoi Engl, 2004
 Prosipho fuscus Thiele, 1912
 Prosipho gaussianus Thiele, 1912
 Prosipho glacialis Thiele, 1912
 Prosipho gracilis Thiele, 1912
 Prosipho grohae Engl, Winfried, 2005
 Prosipho harrietae Engl & Schwabe, 2003
 Prosipho hedleyi Powell, 1958
 Prosipho hunteri Hedley, 1916
 Prosipho iodes Oliver & Picken, 1984
 Prosipho macleani Hedley, 1916
 Prosipho mundus Smith, 1915
 Prosipho nestaris (Fleming, 1948)
 Prosipho nodosus Thiele, 1912
 Prosipho pellitus Thiele, 1912
 Prosipho perversus Powell, 1951
 Prosipho priestleyi (Hedley, 1911)
 Prosipho propinquus Thiele, 1912
 Prosipho pupa Thiele, 1912
 Prosipho pusillus Thiele, 1912
 Prosipho reversa Powell, 1958
 Prosipho shiraseae Numanami, 1996
 Prosipho similis Thiele, 1912
 Prosipho sindemarkae Engl & Schwabe, 2003
 Prosipho spiralis Thiele, 1912
 Prosipho tomlini Powell, 1957
 Prosipho tuberculatus Smith, 1915
 Prosipho turrita Oliver & Picken, 1984
 Prosipho wayae Engl, Winfried, 2005

References

External links

Buccinidae